Tim Godfrey may refer to:
 Tim Godfrey (footballer), Australian rules footballer
 Tim Godfrey (musician), Nigerian gospel singer